Belle Brockhoff (born 12 January 1993) is an Australian snowboarder, who has represented Australia at the FIS Snowboarding World Championships and the Winter Olympics. She competes in snowboard cross. She competed at the 2022 Winter Olympics, in Women's snowboard cross. 

She was a competitor in the 2013 FIS World Championship snowboard cross, and in the 2014 Winter Olympic snowboard cross.

Life 
Brockhoff currently studies a Bachelor of Commerce/Bachelor of Laws at Deakin University, after initially starting a Bachelor of Commerce.

Personal life 
Brockhoff came out as a lesbian in August 2013. She is a supporter and endorser of the Principle 6 campaign, part of the Olympic protests of Russian anti-gay laws, but pledged to be cautious about how actively she protested while in Sochi due to the risk of arrest. In 2014 she appeared in the documentary film To Russia with Love.

References

External links

Olympic snowboarders of Australia
Snowboarders at the 2014 Winter Olympics
Snowboarders at the 2018 Winter Olympics
Snowboarders at the 2022 Winter Olympics
Australian LGBT sportspeople
LGBT snowboarders
Lesbian sportswomen
Living people
Australian female snowboarders
1993 births
Australian people of German descent
Sportspeople from Melbourne
21st-century Australian LGBT people
21st-century Australian women
People from East Melbourne
Sportswomen from Victoria (Australia)